Niamh Coyne (born 22 June 2001) is an Irish swimmer. She competed in the women's 50 metre breaststroke at the 2019 World Aquatics Championships held in Gwangju, South Korea and she did not advance to compete in the semi-finals.

In October 2021, Coyne was named to the Ireland roster for the 2021 World Short Course Championships in Abu Dhabi, United Arab Emirates. In the prelims heats of the 100 metre breaststroke on the fourth day of competition, Coyne ranked 18th with a 1:06.44 and did not qualify for the semifinals. Coyne also finished fifth in prelims heat two of the 200 metre breaststroke with a time of 2:23.03, placing fourteenth across all prelims heats.

At the 2022 U.S. Open Swimming Championships, held in Greensboro, United States, Coyne won the b-final of the 100 metre breaststroke with a time of 1:09.49.

References

External links
 

2001 births
Living people
Irish female swimmers
Place of birth missing (living people)
Swimmers at the 2018 Summer Youth Olympics
Female breaststroke swimmers
21st-century Irish women